VAH-15 was a short-lived Heavy Attack Squadron of the U.S. Navy, based at NAS Norfolk, Virginia. The squadron flew the North American AJ Savage and Lockheed TV-2 Seastar aircraft.

The squadron was established on 15 January 1958 with the designation heavy attack but its primary mission was to provide aerial refueling to the Naval Air Force, Atlantic Fleet. It was disestablished a little more than one year later, on 15 February 1959.

See also
 History of the United States Navy
 List of inactive United States Navy aircraft squadrons

References

Heavy attack squadrons of the United States Navy
Wikipedia articles incorporating text from the Dictionary of American Naval Aviation Squadrons